Axius serratus is a species of thalassinidean crustacean found off the Atlantic coast of Canada and the United States, from Nova Scotia to Maryland. It is capable of living in areas which are so polluted that other benthic animals cannot survive.

References

Thalassinidea
Crustaceans of the Atlantic Ocean
Crustaceans described in 1852
Taxa named by William Stimpson